Gnathoenia albomaculata is a species of beetle in the family Cerambycidae. It was described by Quedenfeldt in 1881. It is known from Angola and the Democratic Republic of the Congo.

References

Ceroplesini
Beetles described in 1881